Acuetzpalin (meaning "water lizard" in Classical Nahuatl) is an extinct genus of platypterygiine ophthalmosaurid ichthyosaur found in the Kimmeridgian La Casita Formation in Mexico. It is known from a partial skeleton (missing the limbs), of which the skull is surprisingly well preserved. It was the first ichthyosaur described in 2020 and the first new ichthyosaur genus described since 2017 (both Gengasaurus and Keilhauia were described in 2017).

Classification
A phylogenetic analysis conducted in 2020 reveals that Acuetzpalin is a member of the subfamily Platypterygiinae and is located among the most-derived platypterygiines.

Phylogeny
The following cladogram shows a possible phylogenetic position of Acuetzpalin in Ophthalmosauridae according to the analysis performed by Zverkov and Jacobs (2020).

References 

Fossil taxa described in 2020
Late Jurassic ichthyosaurs
Jurassic reptiles of North America
Ichthyosauromorph genera